Namu or NAMU may refer to:

The North American Monetary Union
The National Art Museum of Ukraine
Namu, British Columbia, a town in Canada
Namu Atoll, an atoll in the Pacific Ocean
Namu doll, a type of Pullip doll
Yang Erche Namu, a Chinese singer and writer of Mosuo ethnicity
Namu (orca), one of the first orcas (killer whales) displayed in captivity.
Namu, the Killer Whale, a 1966 American film
Namu, a human character in the Japanese cartoon Dragon Ball
 Namuwiki, a Korean-language wiki
 the local Māori name for the Austrosimulium genus of flies found in New Zealand, also known as "sandflies"